Irvine Meadow XI Football Club is a Scottish football club, based in Irvine, North Ayrshire. The club's home ground is Meadow Park in central Irvine, and they play in royal blue strips.

History 
Formed in 1897, they are one of the most successful Junior clubs still playing. Of the two clubs in Irvine, the other being Irvine Victoria, they are the larger. Meadow have set many attendance records at other Junior clubs' grounds and were at one stage invited to turn senior and play in the Scottish Football League. They decided to remain in the 'juniors' and at present compete in the Western Region Junior League.  

Irvine Meadow's closest rivals are Kilwinning Rangers, based in the neighbouring town of Kilwinning, and Irvine Victoria who play on the other side of the River Irvine at Victoria Park. An annual derby fixture is played each August to coincide with Irvine's Marymass Festival. After recent dominance in the fixture over the past decade, Meadow lost 3–1 at Victoria Park in 2017, the first time in 11 years that they had not won the match.

In recent times, Irvine Meadow have another rivalry with Auchinleck Talbot, with the two often contending against each other for the  regional title and cups. Talbot are sometimes regarded as Meadow's largest rivals, despite the distance between the two clubs within Ayrshire.

In 1933, the club played two minor cup finals and the replay of one of those over two days due to fixture congestion at the end of the season, winning both (they also won the regional league and another cup that year). Meadow were the first junior club in Scotland to have a home game televised when the 1958 Scottish Junior Cup tie against Fauldhouse United was shown on Scotsport. They are the only junior football club to have travelled by air to a game when they went to St. Andrew's stadium to play Birmingham City in a match in which they lost 4–3. 

Between 2006 and 2012, Meadow bought players from senior teams such as Brian McGinty and Mark Crilly and did well in the Scottish Junior Cup, as well as winning promotion from the Ayrshire League in 2005–06 and from Super League Division One in 2006–07. They have had a successful period in the subsequent years with Stagecoach West Premier Super League titles in 2008–09, 2010–11 and 2011–12 as well as Evening Times and West of Scotland Cup wins.

On 28 November 2009, Meadow became the first junior club to defeat Scottish Football League opposition in a competitive fixture when they beat Arbroath 1–0 in the third round of the 2009–10 Scottish Cup in front of a crowd of over 1,100. The club were then drawn away to SPL side Hibernian in the fourth round. The game, which took place on 9 January 2010, was arguably the biggest game in the club's history. Irvine lost 3–0, but the club stood to make in the region of £55,000 from this fixture, and an estimated 2,000 Meadow fans made the journey to Edinburgh.

In the 2011–12 season, Meadow reached the third round of the Scottish Cup, where they hosted First Division side Livingston at Meadow Park. The tie took place on 19 November 2011. Meadow were well beaten 6–0.

Former players Gareth Turner and Michael Wardrope were appointed as the new management team in May 2016 to replace the departing Davie Greig, and the pair took charge for the start of the 2016–17 season. On 25 October 2017, the new management of Brian McGinty and Stevie Aitchison took over. In June 2018, Irvine Meadow gained promotion via the play-offs to the West Region Premiership for the 2018–19 season.

Brian McGinty resigned as manager on 28 January 2020.

The club moved to the senior West of Scotland Football League along with all other West Region Junior teams in 2020. Floodlights were installed at Meadow Park in February 2021 to meet SFA licensing criteria.

Current squad

Honours

Major competitions
Scottish Junior Cup
 Winners (3): 1958–59, 1962–63, 1972–73
 Runners-up: 1947–48, 1950–51

SJFA West Region Premiership
 Champions (3): 2008–09, 2010–11, 2011–12

Minor competitions
 West of Scotland Cup: 1931–32, 1950–51, 1955–56, 1961–62, 1969–70, 1970–71, 1989–90, 2009–10, 2011–12
 Western League / Ayrshire First Division: 1921–22, 1932–33, 1948–49, 1950–51, 1954–55, 1956–57, 1957–58, 1960–61, 1969–70, 1970–71, 1988–89, 1993–94
Western Intermediate League: 1928–29
 Ayrshire Second Division: 1998–99
 Stagecoach Ayrshire League: 2005–06
 Ayrshire Cup: 1898–99, 1900–01, 1903–04, 1913–14, 1931–32, 1953–54, 1957–58, 1969–70, 1970–71, 1983–84, 1984–85, 2005–06, 2006–07, 2010–11
 Ayrshire League Cup: 1927–28, 1928–29, 1950–51, 1954–55, 1955–56, 1961–62, 1982–83
 Ayrshire District Cup: 1899–1900, 1903–04, 1909–10, 1913–14, 1914–15, 1932–33, 1938–39, 1946–47, 1950–51, 1951–52, 1954–55, 1955–56, 1957–58, 1970–71, 1976–77, 1977–78, 1981–82, 1987–88
 Cunninghame District Cup: 1982–83, 1983–84, 1985–86, 1987–88, 1991–92, 1994–95
 North Ayrshire Cup: 1996–97, 2002–03
 Western Intermediate League Cup: 1927–28, 1928–29
 Irvine & District League: 1910–11
 Dryborough Cup 1972–73
 Ayrshire Consolation Cup: 1914–15, 1915–16, 1932–33
 Ayrshire Charity Cup: 1934–35
 Moore Trophy 1932–33, 1938–39
 Vernon Trophy: 1949–50, 1952–53, 1960–61
 Irvine Herald Cup: 1898–99, 1914–15, 1924–25
 St Vincent de Paul Cup:1933–34
 Evening Times Super Cup 2005–06, 2009–2010
 Stagecoach Super League First Division: 2006–07
 Kerr & Smith League Cup: 2003–04

References

External links 
 
Video clip from 1973 Scottish Junior Cup Final, hosted by National Library of Scotland

 
Football clubs in Scotland
Scottish Junior Football Association clubs
Football in North Ayrshire
Association football clubs established in 1897
1897 establishments in Scotland
Irvine, North Ayrshire
West of Scotland Football League teams